The Media Fund is a 527 group, active in U.S. politics, which supported Democrat John Kerry's campaign for President.  It was formed in 2002, and is led by Harold M. Ickes, a former aide to President Bill Clinton.  Its chief fundraiser is Ellen Malcolm, a former fundraiser for EMILY's List.  Billionaire George Soros was among the largest donors to the Fund.  According to the New York Times, the Media Fund raised $45 million to run issue ads in key swing states.  The Media Fund is one of several 527 groups which supported Kerry; others include America Coming Together and MoveOn.org. After the election, the group experienced a dramatic drop in fundraising success; media reports speculated that major donors had given up on the organization, and were turning their attention to other, more long-term Democratic projects.

Legal issues

Following the campaign of John Kerry, the Federal Election Commission unanimously voted to levy a $580,000 fine against the Fund.  The penalty was the seventh largest in FEC history.  The FEC determined that more than 90 percent of the $60 million raised by the Media Fund came from labor unions, corporations or from donors who gave more $5,000 — all contributions barred by federal election rules.  Lyn Utrecht represented the Media Fund in the settlement.  Erik Smith, president of the Media Fund, would later issue a statement pointing out that the FEC settlement did not find his group in violation of the law. The FEC had already fined a number of the other major 527s for illegal spending during the 2004 elections, including the Democratic-leaning groups MoveOn.org and the George Soros-backed America Coming Together, as well as the Republican-supporting groups Progress for America Voter Fund and Swift Boat Veterans for Truth.

Further reading

"California Group Steps into Vacuum on Left", Washington Post, by Thomas B. Edsall and Chris Cillizza, October 23, 2005.
"FEC slaps Media Fund with huge fine", Politico, by Kenneth P. Vogel, December 19, 2007.

2002 establishments in the United States
527 organizations
Organizations established in 2002